St Mary's Abbey may refer to:

Ireland
 St. Mary's Abbey, Dublin
 St. Mary's Abbey, Glencairn
 St. Mary's Abbey, Trim

Germany
 St. Mary's Abbey, Engelthal
 St. Mary's Abbey, Fulda

United Kingdom
Wales
 St Mary's Abbey, Bardsey Island

England
 St Mary's Abbey, Kenilworth
 St Mary's Abbey, Leiston
 Abbey Church of St Mary, Nuneaton
 St Mary's Abbey, Thetford
 St Mary's Abbey, West Malling
 St Mary's Abbey, Winchester
 St Mary's Abbey, York

United States
 St. Mary's Abbey, New Jersey